Low Birth Weight is an album by Piano Magic. It was released in 1999 on Rocket Girl. The cover image is a portion of "The Kittens' Tea Party", by Walter Potter.

Critical reception
Exclaim! wrote that "the sparse use of warm analogue electronics and the soft musical complexion bring to mind American bands like Low, although Piano Magic has a distinctly British vibe, owing an appropriate debt to the hypnotic ambience of Spacemen 3 and My Bloody Valentine."

Track listing 

 "Snowfall Soon" 5:01
 "Crown Estate" 4:33
 "Bad Patient" 4:59
 "The Fun of the Century" 5:01
 "Birdymachine" 1:25
 "Not Fair" 4:12
 "Dark Secrets Look for Light" 4:52
 "Snow Drums" 4:59
 "Shepherds Are Needed" 5:20
 "I Am the Sub-Librarian" 4:25
 "Waking Up" 5:49 (Disco Inferno cover)

References

1999 albums
Piano Magic albums